This was the first edition of the tournament.

Ante Pavić and Danilo Petrović won the title after defeating Benjamin Lock and Fernando Romboli 6–7(2–7), 6–4, [10–5] in the final.

Seeds

Draw

References
 Main Draw

Puerto Vallarta - Doubles